Flying Spur may refer to:

Automobiles 
 Bentley S2 Continental Flying Spur (1959-1962)
 Bentley S3 Continental Flying Spur (1962-1965)
 Bentley Flying Spur (2005) (2005-present)

Other uses 
 Flying Spur (horse), a racehorse
 Flying spur (clipper), a tea clipper